Neil Charles Kaplan is an American voice actor, audiobook narrator, entertainer, and comedian. His most well known voice roles are Hawkmon from Digimon, Genryūsai Shigekuni Yamamoto from Bleach, Emperor Zarkon from Voltron: Legendary Defender and Madara Uchiha from Naruto.

Biography
Kaplan got his start as a comedian doing impressions of presidents such as Ronald Reagan and Richard Nixon. He also impersonated a little-known journalist at the time, Dan Rather. He then started work on video games, including several Star Wars titles. From there he went on to do such shows as Power Rangers, Digimon: Digital Monsters and Transformers: Robots in Disguise. He was once a contestant on the game show Street Smarts. On that appearance, he showed off some of his other impressions, including one of Gilbert Gottfried. He was a guest to the Power Morphicon (in Los Angeles) in June 2007 and August 2010, to Armageddon (in Australia and New Zealand) in October 2007, and to AVCon: Adelaide's Anime & Video Games Festival (in Australia) in July 2018. He also created the television series The Way it WASN'T! and the graphic novel I, of the Wolf. He voices Captain Fort Worth in the adult video game BoneCraft.

Filmography

Anime

Animation

Films
 Digimon: The Movie – Hawkmon, Halsemon
 Dragon Quest: Your Story – Dr. Agon, Zenith Dragon
 Muhammad: The Last Prophet – 'Amr ibn al-'As, The Spy
 The Happy Cricket – Toad #1
 The Little Polar Bear – Bert
 Promare – Vulcan Haestus

Video games

 Baten Kaitos Origins – Wiseman/Verus Wiseman
 BioShock Infinite – Thursday Warren, John Hammond, Ezekiel Price
 BoneCraft – Captain Fort Worth
 Cartoon Network: Punch Time Explosion – Grim, Johnny Bravo
 Conan – Bone Cleaver
 Conan Exiles - Nunu the Cannibal, Additional Voice
 Destiny 2 – Dominus Ghaul
DreamWorks Voltron VR Chronicles – Emperor Zarkon
 Fallout 76 – Biv, Derrick Taylor, Dr. Emerson Hale, Hubert, Lev, Marcus, Intercom, Raiders, Blood Eagles
 Final Fantasy XIII – Additional Voices
 Final Fantasy XIII-2 – Additional Voices
 Final Fantasy XV – Additional voices
 Guild Wars 2 – Various Charr and Norn NPCs, Edrick Thorn
 Hearthstone – Cenarius
 Heroes of the Storm – Tychus
 Infamous First Light – Additional Voices
 Justice League Heroes – Gorilla Grodd
 League of Legends – Aurelion Sol, the Star Forger
 Lightning Returns: Final Fantasy XIII – Additional Voices
 Marvel Heroes – Sabretooth, Venom
 Middle-earth: Shadow of Mordor – Nemesis Orcs, Humans
 Naruto Shippuden: Ultimate Ninja Storm 3 –  Obito Uchiha (Ninja War Tobi), Madara Uchiha
 Naruto Shippuden: Ultimate Ninja Storm 4 – Madara Uchiha, Obito Uchiha (Ninja War Tobi)
 Naruto Shippuden: Ultimate Ninja Storm Generations – Madara Uchiha
 Naruto Shippuden: Ultimate Ninja Storm Revolution – Madara Uchiha, Obito Uchiha (Ninja War Tobi)
 Ninja Gaiden II – Genshin
 Red Dead Redemption 2 – The Local Pedestrian Population
 Skylanders: Giants – Batterson, Hatterson
 Skylanders: Spyro's Adventure – Nort, Weapon Master
 Skylanders: Trap Team – Batterson, Hatterson
 Spider-Man 3 – Kraven the Hunter
 Spider-Man: Battle for New York – Norman Osborn / Green Goblin
 Star Wars: The Old Republic – Skadge
 StarCraft II: Wings of Liberty – Tychus Findlay, Reaper, Vulture
 StarCraft II: Legacy of the Void - Herc
 Tell Me Why – Tom Vecchi / Alexander Kershwin	
 The Last of Us – Additional Voices
 Transformers: Revenge of the Fallen – Long Haul
 Warhammer 40,000: Dawn of War II – Retribution – Ork Nob
 World of Warcraft: Cataclysm – Cenarius
 World of Warcraft: Warlords of Draenor – Additional Voices

Live-action
 Beetleborgs Metallix – Hornix, Witch Doctor (voices, credited as Bob Johnson)
 Big Bad Beetleborgs – Venus Claptrap (voice, credited as Bob Johnson)
 Mighty Morphin Power Rangers: The Movie – Oozemen (voice, uncredited)
 Power Rangers Lightspeed Rescue – Diabolico, Gold Beaked Monster (voices)
 Power Rangers Lost Galaxy – Destruxo (voice), Mutantrum (2nd voice)
 Power Rangers Time Force – Gluto (voice), Recap Narrator (voice, uncredited)

References

External links
Neil Kaplan - official website
Neil Kaplan's Facebook

American male voice actors
American male comedians
American impressionists (entertainers)
American male video game actors
Contestants on American game shows
Living people
Jewish American male actors
Jewish American comedians
21st-century American comedians
21st-century American Jews
Year of birth missing (living people)